The Crocodile River is a short river in the Boundary Water Canoe Area of Cook County,  Minnesota.  It originates in Crocodile Lake and runs to Bearskin.

See also
List of rivers of Minnesota

References

Rivers of Minnesota
Rivers of Cook County, Minnesota